Aircraft Industries L 410 NG ("New Generation") is a twin-engine 19-seat aircraft manufactured by Czech company, Aircraft Industries (formerly Let Kunovice). The aircraft is an upgraded version of the Let L 410 UVP-E20. The first flight took place on 29 July 2015. Serial production of the L 410 NG began in March 2018.

Development
The development of the modernized L 410 was launched in 2010. The first prototype L 410 NG was first presented to the public on July 15, 2015 at Kunovice Airport in Slovácko. The first flight took place on July 29, 2015 at Kunovice Airport. The basic flight characteristics and performance of the airplane, as well as proper operation of the airplane control system, propulsion unit, fuel system, avionics and navigation systems have been verified.

Design
Compared to previous models, the L 410 NG has significant changes. It comes with new, more powerful GE H85-200 engines, combined with quieter AV-725 propellers; a new wing design featuring an integrated fuel tank; a more modern cockpit from Garmin; and a bigger luggage compartment. 

With these improvements, the L 410 NG has doubled the maximum distance it can fly and can carry 500 kilograms in increased payload than the previous model. Like its predecessor  UVP-E20, it will be sold in all variations. It is intended for commercial airlines, government agencies, non-governmental organizations, and armed forces. In addition to the passenger version, it can also be configured as a cargo plane. It can be used especially in island states where there is a problem of refueling in remote islands.

Operational history

A series of certification flights were done in accordance with the relevant regulations. Certified by the European Aviation Safety Agency (EASA) and the Russian Interstate Aviation Committee (MAK). Development started in April 2010, costs of the project is 568 million crowns, 237 million was paid by the Ministry of Industry and Trade of Czech Republic.

In March 2018, serial production started. The first serial produced L 410 NG traveled to a customer in Russia. Production of 16 aircraft is planned for 2019, half of them will be flown to Russia, six aircraft will be delivered to Kazakhstan and two to Poland.

Specification (L 410NG)

See also

References

 
 
 
 
 
 
 

2010s Czech aircraft
2015 introductions
Let aircraft
High-wing aircraft
Twin-turboprop tractor aircraft